Tsurugi may refer to:

Places
Tsurugi, Ishikawa, Japan
Tsurugi, Tokushima, Japan
Mount Tsurugi, Japan

People
, Japanese actor and television personality
Kagami Tsurugi, a fictional character in the animated series Miraculous: Tales of Ladybug & Cat Noir

Other uses
Tsurugi (sword), a type of Japanese sword
Tsurugi butai ("strike force Tsurugi"), an alternate name for the World War II Japanese Air Group 343 Kōkūtai, after the tsurugi Japanese sword
Tsurugi (train), a train service in Japan
Tsurugi-class patrol vessel
Nakajima Ki-115 aircraft, known as Tsurugi

See also
Tsurugisan (train)